Protected Historic Landmarks (/) are historical places in the Republic of Serbia that have the third level of the State protection.

Those are part of the Cultural Heritage of Serbia protection list.

See also
 Cultural Heritage of Serbia
 History of Serbia

Notes and references
Notes:

References:

External links 
 Знаменита места at www.spomenicikulture.mi.sanu.ac.rs

 01
Cultural heritage of Serbia
Serbia history-related lists
Serbian culture